Seedfolks (1997) is a children's novella written by Paul Fleischman, with illustrations by Judy Pedersen.  The story is told by a diverse cast of characters living on (or near) Gibb Street in Cleveland, Ohio, each from a different ethnic group. Chapter by chapter, each character describes the transformation of an empty lot into a vibrant community garden, and in doing so, they each experience their own transformations.

Awards and recognitions
ALA Best Books for Young Adults (1998)
 Buckeye Children's Book Award (1999), Grades 6-8
Special Book Award of China (2008)

References

 Fleischman, Paul. Seedfolks. HarperTrophy, 1997. Print.
 Fleischman, Paul. Seedfolks. HarperTeen, 1999. Print.

External links
 About Seedfolks

1997 American novels
American children's novels
Novels set in Cleveland
Novels by Paul Fleischman
1997 children's books
Children's novellas